The 2021–22 Harvard Crimson Men's ice hockey season is the 121st season of play for the program. The represent Harvard University in the 2021–22 NCAA Division I men's ice hockey season and for the 60th season in the ECAC Hockey conference. The Crimson are coached by Ted Donato, in his 17th season, and play their home games at Bright-Landry Hockey Center.

Season
Returning after losing an entire season to the COVID-19 pandemic, Harvard shot out of the starting gate. The team rode a hail of offensive firepower to four wins, including one over long-time rival Cornell. The Crimson swiftly found themselves ranked in the top-10, but the lofty position didn't last for long. Over the succeeding four weeks, Harvard's scoring all but vanished and the team won just once in six matches. The squad didn't fully recover until after the winter break but, even then, inconsistent play sent them sliding down the rankings.

Throughout the entire season, Harvard never once found itself below .500, however, the Crimson were hampered by the general weakness of their conference. While Harvard was able to recover after missing a year, many of their compatriots were near the bottom of the national rankings. This meant that conference wins weren't particularly helpful while most losses were severely taxing. To make matters worse, when Harvard played in the Beanpot, the best chance for the team to gain in the PairWise, Boston College was having an unusually bad year and going winless in the tournament dealt a serious blow to Harvard's postseason hopes. Evan a win over #4 Quinnipiac near the end of the year didn't markedly improve their chances and when their regular season came to a close, Harvard had no chance to make the NCAA tournament without a conference championship.

ECAC tournament
The Crimson received a bye into the quarterfinal round but the time off didn't appear to help. Harvard found itself down 0–3 to Rensselaer and was unable to score at even strength. Desperate to give his team an advantage, Ted Donato was forced to pull Mitchell Gibson with about 5 minutes to play but the ploy worked. Harvard scored three times with an extra attacker, the last with just 15 seconds remaining in regulation, and tied the game. With all of the momentum now in the Crimson's favor, the team took charge in overtime and Jack Donato won the game after just a couple of minutes. The team found its position reversed in the second game when, after taking an early 2–0 lead, Harvard surrendered three consecutive goals and had to fight to tie the game for a second straight match. While they were able to do so, Rensselaer fought hard in the overtime and managed to secure the winning marker just after the start of the fifth period. In the rubber match, the defense finally put together a complete game and held the Engineers off of the scoresheet for more than 56 minutes. RPI managed to score their only goal of the game late in the third but it was not enough to overcome Harvard's lead and the Crimson escaped with a series victory.

Harvard faced Clarkson in the semifinal and came out swinging. The Crimson twice took a lead in the game but the Golden Knights quickly replied both times. By the start of the third period it appeared that Harvard was going to be sunk by taking bad penalties, but their top line surged in the final frame. Nick Abruzzese, Matthew Coronato and Sean Farrell, who had already combined for 5 points, spearheaded the Crimson comeback and scored three goals in the third. While the team took two more penalties, their defense held and stopped Clarkson from replying, sending the Crimson to the conference title game.

With their hopes of a postseason bid nearly achieved, Harvard had to get past the stingiest defense in the country. The team's offense was severely limited in scoring opportunities, recording just 12 shots in regulation to Quinnipiac's 42, but the Crimson were able to get two past Yaniv Perets and push the game into overtime. The opportunities were much more even in the extra session and, about mid-way through the period, Harvard's top line was again the hero when Coronato fired the winning goal from the top of the left circle.

NCAA tournament
Harvard's reward for winning their conference title was being placed opposite the #1 team in the nation, Minnesota State. The Mavericks had lost just once since late November and looked primed for a championship run. The game was playing out as expected with MSU dominating play and taking a 3-0 lead before the match was half over. The Crimson looked like they were going to be swept out of the building until Sean Farrell fired a puck from behind the goal line that deflected off of Dryden McKay and into the net. The luck break was just what the team needed and, less than a minute later, Harvard had cut the deficit to 1. Minnesota State halted the Crimson charge in the third, regaining their 2-goal edge, but Harvard would not surrender so easily. After forcing the Mavericks into a penalty in the final 5 minutes, Gibson was pulled and Casey Dornbach scored on the ensuing 2-man advantage. In the final minutes, Harvard went on total attack with their goaltender sitting on the bench. Coronato twice had looks at a half-empty cage but wasn't able to get a shot on goal. In the end the comeback bid fell just short and Harvard's season was over.

Departures

Recruiting

Roster
As of September 23, 2021.

|}

Standings

Schedule and results

|-
!colspan=12 style=";" | Exhibition

|-
!colspan=12 style=";" | Regular season

|-
!colspan=12 ! style=""; | 

|-
!colspan=12 style=";" | 

|- align="center" bgcolor="#e0e0e0"
|colspan=12|Harvard Won Series 2–1

|-
!colspan=12 style=";" |

Scoring statistics

Goaltending statistics

Note: Gibson and Schaedig shared the shutout against Princeton on February 27.

Rankings

Note: USCHO did not release a poll in week 24.

Awards and honors

Players drafted into the NHL

2022 NHL Entry Draft

† incoming freshman

References

2021–22
Harvard Crimson
Harvard Crimson
Harvard Crimson
Harvard Crimson
Harvard Crimson
Harvard Crimson